Acacia sericophylla is a shrub or tree commonly known as the desert dogwood, desert oak or cork-bark wattle. To the Indigenous Australian people of the Pilbara, the Nyangumarta peoples, it is known as Pirrkala. The species is of the genus Acacia and the subgenus Plurinerves.

Description
It usually has a single stem or few mains stems at the base from where it can regenerate after bushfires. It has thick spongy grey to back bark that fissures longitudinally and is spongy and yellow beneath. The brittle branchlets tend to break easily and are covered in fine silvery hairs but becoming glabrous with age. Like most species of Acacia it has phyllodes rather than true leaves. The silvery grey-green phyllodes are found in clumps at the end of the branchlets and have a long narrowly linear and strap-like appearance. The spreading to erect phyllodes are straight or recurved and densely covered in fine silky hair when young but becoming sub-glabrous as they age with many parallel, fine longitudinal nerves that are equally prominent.

Taxonomy
In 1859 Ferdinand von Mueller described this species, and named it Acacia sericophylla. In 1993, Richard Cowan and Bruce Maslin assigned it to the subspecies, Acacia coriacea subsp. sericophylla. However, the Council of Heads of Australasian Herbaria via the Australian Plant Census currently (2006) recognises the plant as Acacia sericophylla.

Etymology
The species epithet, sericophylla, derives from the Greek words, sericos (silken) and phyllon (leaf), and refers to the dense silky hairs found particularly on the young phyllodes.

Distribution
It is native to an area in the Northern Territory and the Kimberley and Pilbara regions of Western Australia. It is also found in New South Wales and South Australia.

Gallery

See also
 List of Acacia species

References

External links
See Acacia sericophylla Pilbara wattles, for further images, and description.

sericophylla
Acacias of Western Australia
Flora of the Northern Territory
Taxa named by Ferdinand von Mueller
Plants described in 1859